Deportivo Lenca was a Honduran soccer club based on El Progreso, Honduras.

It played in Liga de Ascenso de Honduras but in 2008 it was bought by Club Junior from El Negrito, Yoro. They currently play in Liga Mayor de Honduras.

Their name derives from the Lenca people and their emblem once feature the Chief Lempira, a national hero in Honduras.

Achievements
Segunda División / Liga de Ascenso
Winners (1): 2005–06 C
Runners-up (2): 1970–71, 1975

Yoro Championship
Winners (1): 1961

References

Defunct football clubs in Honduras